Shameer Muhammed is an Indian film editor and producer predominantly working in Malayalam cinema. He was an alumnus of Chethana Media Institute, Thrissur. He worked as a spot editor in several movies and his debut as an independent editor was Charlie.

Career 
Muhammed started his career as an editor for ad films and albums. Then he moved to Tamil film industry and have worked as an assistant to award-winning film editor late Kishor Te. He started working in Malayalam film industry as a spot editor of the Grandmaster movie, directed by B. Unnikrishnan. He have worked as spot editor for movies like Nee Ko Nja Cha, Jawan of Vellimala, I Love Me, Kalimannu, Memories , Balyakalasakhi, Salaam Kashmir, Ennu Ninte Moideen. He had done the editing of the fight sequences of Gabbar is back, Valiyavan, Sandamarutham and Singam 3.He also edited ads of several multi national brands and done more than 15 trailers. He turned independent with film Charlie, directed by Martin Prakkat.

Personal life
Muhammed married Reshma and the couple have two children. The family is currently staying along with his mother, Shereefa in Vyttila, Kochi

Filmography

References

External links 
 

Living people
Malayalam film editors
Film editors from Kerala
Artists from Kerala
Year of birth missing (living people)